Desert Palms is a census-designated place in the Coachella Valley of eastern Riverside County, southern California.

Geography

According to the United States Census Bureau, the CDP covers an area of 2.7 square miles (6.9 km), 99.97% of it land and 0.03% of it water.  The 2010 United States census reported Desert Palms's population was 6,957.

Demographics

At the 2010 census Desert Palms had a population of 6,957. The racial makeup of Desert Palms was 6,728 (96.7%) White, 59 (0.8%) African American, 16 (0.2%) Native American, 95 (1.4%) Asian, 5 (0.1%) Pacific Islander, 15 (0.2%) from other races, and 39 (0.6%) from two or more races. Hispanic or Latino of any race were 177 people (2.5%).

The whole population lived in households, no one lived in non-institutionalized group quarters and no one was institutionalized.

There were 4,104 households, 11 (0.3%) had children under the age of 18 living in them, 2,424 (59.1%) were opposite-sex married couples living together, 71 (1.7%) had a female householder with no husband present, 23 (0.6%) had a male householder with no wife present.  There were 120 (2.9%) unmarried opposite-sex partnerships, and 46 (1.1%) same-sex married couples or partnerships. 1,381 households (33.7%) were one person and 1,208 (29.4%) had someone living alone who was 65 or older. The average household size was 1.70.  There were 2,518 families (61.4% of households); the average family size was 2.04.

The age distribution was 17 people (0.2%) under the age of 18, 8 people (0.1%) aged 18 to 24, 67 people (1.0%) aged 25 to 44, 1,081 people (15.5%) aged 45 to 64, and 5,784 people (83.1%) who were 65 or older.  The median age was 74.1 years. For every 100 females, there were 79.2 males.  For every 100 females age 18 and over, there were 79.0 males.

There were 5,055 housing units at an average density of 1,892.4 per square mile, of the occupied units 3,747 (91.3%) were owner-occupied and 357 (8.7%) were rented. The homeowner vacancy rate was 2.4%; the rental vacancy rate was 17.7%.  6,420 people (92.3% of the population) lived in owner-occupied housing units and 537 people (7.7%) lived in rental housing units.

See also

References

Census-designated places in Riverside County, California
Coachella Valley
Populated places in the Colorado Desert
Census-designated places in California